Philipsburg Manor (sometimes referred to as Philipse Manor) was a manor located north of New York City in Westchester County in the Province of New York.  Netherlands-born Frederick Philipse I and two partners made the initial purchase of land that had been part of a Dutch patroonship owned by Adriaen van der Donck.  Philipse subsequently bought his partners out and added more land before being granted a royal charter in 1693 for the  estate, becoming its first lord. 

After his death, the manor was split between his son and grandson, both of whom continued its development. Among the family's numerous enterprises, the Philipses engaged in the slave trade, using their own slaves to construct most of the buildings on the Philipsburg property. The tenant farmers on the manor represented a diverse population of Europeans. 

The manor's property was confiscated during the American Revolution when Loyalist Frederick Philipse III, its third and final lord, was attainted for treason by New York's revolutionary government in 1779. The estate's land was used as collateral to raise money to fund the rebellion and later sold at auction. Some of the original structures still stand, including the Philipsburg Manor House in Sleepy Hollow, Philipse Manor Hall (the family seat) in Yonkers, and the Old Dutch Church of Sleepy Hollow, all of which are National Historic Landmarks.

History

The land that would become Philipsburg Manor was first bought from Adriaen van der Donck, who had been granted a Dutch patroonship in New Netherland before the English takeover in 1664. Frederick Philipse I, Thomas Delavall, and Thomas Lewis purchased the first tracts in 1672 in current-day northern Yonkers. Philipse made several additional purchases between 1680 and 1686 from the Wiechquaeskeck and Sinsink Indian tribes, expanding the property both north and south; he also bought a small plot of land from the Tappans west of the Hudson River. Philipse also bought out his partners' stakes during this time.

The estate's boundaries were the Spuyten Duyvil Creek to the south, the Croton River to the north, the Hudson River to the west, and the Bronx River to the east. Philipse was granted a royal charter in 1693, creating the Manor of Philipsburg and making him first lord of the manor. Along with the three other main manors of the colony—Rensselaerswyck, Cortlandt, and Livingston—Philipsburg created one of the richest and most powerful families in the colony. When Philipse died in 1702, the manor was divided between his son, Adolphus Philipse, and grandson, Frederick Philipse II. Adolphus received the Upper Mills property, which extended from Dobbs Ferry to the Croton River. Frederick II was given the Lower Mills, which included the  family seat, Philipse Manor Hall, at the confluence of the then Neperhan River (today's Saw Mill) and Hudson Rivers; the two parcels were reunited on his uncle's death. Frederick II's son, Frederick III, became the third lord of the manor in 1751.

The Philipses used slaves to build various structures at the Upper and Lower Mills. The Upper Mills saw the building of two gristmills on the Pocantico River as well as a stone manor house, wharf, cooperage, and bake house. Most of the structures were completed by 1697, including the Old Dutch Church of Sleepy Hollow, now a National Historic Landmark. The Lower Mills saw a gristmill and  Philipse Manor Hall built on the north bank of the Neperhan. The Philipses' aim was to make the manor a center for agriculture, which was achieved.

In the 18th century, tenant farmers moved in from Great Britain, the Netherlands, France, Germany, and elsewhere within North America. By the beginning of the American Revolution in 1776, the population was about 1,000, up from 200 at the time of Frederick I's death.

Several years into the Revolution Frederick Philipse III, a Loyalist, was attainted for treason along with his family. The manor was confiscated in 1779 and used as collateral to raise funds for the Colonial cause. After the war it was sold at public auction, split between 287 buyers. The largest tract, the (about ) Upper Mills, was purchased by Gerard Beekman; the lower, including Manor Hall, went to Cornelius Low. That parcel was passed to numerous owners until 1951, when it was acquired by Sleepy Hollow Restorations (now Historic Hudson Valley). Philipse Manor Hall served as Yonkers City Hall from 1872 until 1908. Both homes became National Historic Landmarks on November 5, 1961 and are now house museums.

Legacy
In 2004, it was added to the African American Heritage Trail of Westchester County, a group of 14 sites which include the Rye African-American Cemetery, Saint Paul's Church National Historic Site and the Jay Estate.

See also
Land patent

References

Pre-statehood history of New York (state)
History of the Bronx
Houses in Westchester County, New York
1693 establishments in the Province of New York
1779 disestablishments in the United States
Philipse family
African-American history of Westchester County, New York